Samaypur is an urban village in North Delhi prominently located with  NH-1 (GT Karnal Road) on one side and Badli Railway Station & Samaypur Badli Metro Station on the other.

Geography 
The transport center, Sanjay Gandhi Transport Nagar and the residential areas, Teachers Colony, Yadav Nagar, Shiv Puri, Prem Nagar and Mandir Mohalla are part of the village.

The area is dominated by industries and a local market catering to the nearby area, with the railway underbridge the area is well connected to Rohini sub-city. The area was declared an extensive industrial area after the Samaypur village land had been consolidated in 1953-1954.

Facilities 
 Metro Station - Samaypur Badli
 Railway Station - Badli (preferably situated in samaypur)
 Bus Stations - Libaspur, Samaypur, Badli Railway Station
 State Bank of India - Samaypur
 Bank Of Baroda - Samaypur
 Post Office (Samaypur)
 Police Station Samaypur
 HDFC Bank-Samaypur 
 Hospital

Connectivity 
Libaspur is the nearest Bus Station on GT Road with it being at a distance of approximately 
Samaypur Badli is Delhi Metro Station on yellow line. Badli Railway is nearest Railway Station, which makes it connected to various parts of Delhi.

Samaypur Industrial Area 
Samaypur Industrial Area is one of the important Industrial areas Amritsar Delhi Kolkata Industrial Corridor, in the west Delhi and east of Sonipat. To its west lie Kundli Industrial Area, Rajiv Gandhi Education City in Sonipat city and Deenbandhu Chhotu Ram University of Science and Technology in Murthal, and to its east lie the Badli Industrial Area and Delhi Technological University India. Nearby are the Delhi Western Peripheral Expressway, Grand Trunk Road (NH 44) and the planned Delhi-Sonipat Rapid Regional Rail Transport System (RRTS). It is also connected by the under implementation Delhi-Sonipat Metro extension of Yellow line to be completed in Phase iV by March 2022.

References

MPD 1962, MPD 2021, Delhi legislative assembly MLA,

Villages in North Delhi district